The Lee and Rose Warner Nature Center (WNC) was an outdoor education facility with a focus on natural history. Warner was the first private nature center in the state of Minnesota. With funding from the Warner Foundation, at its closing WNC was the only nature center in the state of Minnesota to still provide free on-site programming to schools.

On September 5, 2019, the Science Museum and Manitou Fund announced the Warner Nature Center would be closing, with operations winding down fully by December 31, 2019.

Mission

"To build lasting relationships between people and the natural world."

Site
The Lee and Rose Warner Nature Center was a  outdoor school set in undeveloped woodland, marsh, lake, bog, grasslands. The site also included a restoration prairie and savanna. There are over six miles (10 km) of trails on the property but they are not marked and were only for use by groups who have booked a program with the naturalist staff.

The center adjoined Wilder Forest and the combined area of the two organizations approaches .

Warner is home to a wild population of threatened Blanding's turtles. In part because of their presence, the Minnesota Department of Natural Resources has designated the land Warner sits on as important for species in greatest conservation need and a Regionally Significant Ecological Area with a level 3 designation, the highest possible,
.

History
WNC was the oldest private nature center in the state of Minnesota and served about 17,000 people per year, 9,000 of which were school children, with outdoor natural history programming. The first director, Bernie Fashingbauer began work in 1965 as construction began on the main building. The project was initiated by the St. Paul Science Museum (now the Science Museum of Minnesota), The Amherst H. Wilder Foundation and the Junior League of St. Paul. By the spring and fall of 1966, orientation sessions began for teachers. The first students arrived on site in the fall of 1967. At the time, the center was known as both the Wilder Nature Center and The Science Museum Nature Center.

In 1970, the Lee and Rose Warner Foundation purchased  of land and the existing nature center buildings from the Amherst H Wilder Foundation to serve as a memorial to founders Lee and Rose Warner of St Paul. Warner Nature Center was still associated with the Science Museum of Minnesota at the time of closing and financially supported primarily through the generosity of the Lee and Rose Warner Foundation.

Warner has a strong legacy of volunteerism. When Bernie Fashingbauer told people he was going to use volunteer trail guides to take groups of students out on the trails people told him he was crazy. Forty years later, over 100 volunteers continued to dedicate their time to students.

Warner employed 8 full-time staff, two part-time staff, and up to two interns.

Awards
The Warner Nature Center was recognized with an Award of Excellence by the Mutual of Omaha's Wildlife Heritage Center for displaying leadership and vision in promoting awareness and appreciation of our natural world.

Partnerships
The Warner Nature Center was associated with the Science Museum of Minnesota one of the nations leading science education centers.

Warner was a partner with Bird Conservation Minnesota.

Warner was a partner site with the Cornell Laboratory of Ornithology on the NestWatch program.  Warner staff provide training workshops and maintain online camera feeds of nests in the spring.

Footnotes

External links
 Warner Nature Center Official website
 Instant Weather Data Live feed of WNC weather station via AWS
 Clear Sky Chart Astronomy Weather predictions for Warner Nature Center
 SEEK Description Warner's listing on SEEK-Sharing Environmental Education Knowledge
 GoCityKids GoCityKids official listing for Warner Nature Center
 NestWatch Warner's NestWatch page at Cornell Laboratory of Ornithology

Buildings and structures in Washington County, Minnesota
Education in Washington County, Minnesota
Nature centers in Minnesota
Protected areas of Washington County, Minnesota
Tourist attractions in Washington County, Minnesota